Beit Dajan may refer to:

 Beit Dajan, Nablus, a Palestinian village in the Nablus Governorate
 Furush Beit Dajan, a Palestinian village in the Nablus Governorate
 Bayt Dajan, a Palestinian village near Jaffa, depopulated in 1948
 Beit Dagan, a town in Israel near Tel Aviv-Jaffa
 Beth Dagon, the name of two biblical cities